Brykino is a rural locality (a village) in Sizemskoye Rural Settlement, Sheksninsky District, Vologda Oblast, Russia. The population was 14 as of 2002.

Geography 
Brykino is located 57 km north of Sheksna (the district's administrative centre) by road. Knyazhe is the nearest rural locality.

References 

Rural localities in Sheksninsky District